The Sindh Institute of Urology & Transplantation (SIUT) is a dialysis & kidney transplant centre located in Pakistan.
SIUT was founded by Dr. Adibul Hasan Rizvi and it is Pakistan's largest kidney disease center, as well as Pakistan's largest public sector health organisation.  It began as a department of urology at the government-run Civil Hospital in 1970 and became autonomous in 1991. Ten to twelve transplants are performed weekly, and in 2003, doctors at SIUT performed Pakistan's first liver transplant. In 2004, a child care unit was opened.

All services provided by SIUT, including dialysis and transplantation, are provided free of cost with dignity.

SIUT Chablani Medical Center Sukkur

Establishing SIUT, Sukkur, was an innovative response to the need of the people of Sindh was planned in the year 2009. Since SIUT holds human life valuable and healthcare as the people's birthright, kidney patients "are not allowed to die because they cannot afford to live". Dr Rizvi anticipates the needs of his patients and responds accordingly. To make dialysis accessible, he conceptualized a network of satellite centers in various parts of Pakistan to save patients the trouble of commuting from far-flung areas of Sindh, southern parts of Punjab and Baluchistan to go for this procedure twice a week as far as Karachi.

Introduction and background
At last on 2 February 2012 Prof. Dr. Adibul Hasan Rizvi, Director Sindh Institute of Urology and Transplantation, along with a team of doctors and paramedical staff inaugurated SIUT-Chablani Medical Center Sukkur. Initially as a day care Dialysis Center with 16 Haemodialysis machines and OPD, which shall facilitate a large number of underprivileged patients of Upper Sindh, Lower Punjab & Baluchistan.

Indoor facilities

Clinical laboratory
On 3 October 2013, a special ceremony was held at the Sindh Institute of Urology and Transplantation (SIUT) Chablani Medical Center to dedicate its clinical laboratory in memory of Dr Tanveer Abbasi a renowned writer, poet and intellectual of Sindh.

Indoor ward
In second phase in April 2014, SIUT Chablani Medical center was upgraded to a full-fledged hospital, having 36-bed in its indoor ward. The indoor facilities reported 1,256 indoor admissions in same year and 33,918 patients went to the thrice-a-week outpatient clinic, 16,403 dialysis sessions were performed with 16 Hemodialysis machines, 2,400 patients received lithotripsy, the laboratory carried out 111,913 tests and 4,254 surgeries.

Operation Theater Complex
The Operation Theater Complex was completed with PKR =260/= million and was finally inaugurated on the Saturday 27 April 2019 having four State-of-the-art Operation theaters with a total capacity of 60 beds of which 10 are in the surgical ICU.

Kidney transplant
SIUT is performing deceased organ donation since two decades as one person loses his fight to live every 3 minutes due to end stage organ failure in the country.

First renal transplant was performed at SIUT Chablani Medical Center, Sukkur on Sunday 28 April 2019.

See also
 Adeebul Hasan Rizvi
 Ghulam Muhammad Mahar Medical College

References

External links
Official Website of SIUT

Health in Sindh
1970 establishments in Pakistan
Healthcare in Pakistan